is a railway station on the Nemuro Main Line of JR Hokkaido located in Minamifurano, Hokkaidō, Japan. The station opened on October 1, 1913.

Railway stations in Hokkaido Prefecture
Stations of Hokkaido Railway Company
Railway stations in Japan opened in 1913